The Koulountou River is a river in Senegal and Guinea. It is a tributary of the Gambia River.

The river's source is the Fouta Djallon plateau in northern Guinea. For most of its course, the river flows through southern Senegal.

Settlements on the river include Nadjaf Al Ashraf in Vélingara Department, Senegal.

References 

Gambia River
Rivers of Senegal
Rivers of Africa